A kronkåsa (plural kronkåsor) is a form of elaborate drinking cup that was used during the Renaissance in Sweden.

Description
A kronkåsa is a drinking vessel where the handles are exaggeratedly long and elaborate, thus forming a kind of crown above the cup, hence the name. The crown cups made during the Renaissance were carved from a single root of spruce trees. Later copies from the 19th century were made using other types of wood. The decoration of the crown is likely derived from forms found in the woodwork details of imported late Gothic altarpieces. Many of the cups were painted bright red.

History
Kronkåsor were used in Sweden during the Renaissance as a form of elaborate drinking vessel among the Swedish nobility. Although little is known of their origin, it has been suggested that they reflect an old tradition of elaborately carved wooden drinking vessels popular in Northern and Eastern Europe. The popularity of kronkåsor during the 16th century coincides with a breakthrough in the quality and popularity of wood carving as an art in general in Sweden. According to Olaus Magnus, writing in his A Description of the Northern Peoples in 1555, kronkåsor were made in south-western Finland (at the time part of the Swedish realm) and possibly in Västerbotten. About 20 kronkåsor survive to this day, most of them preserved in museums. Many of them are intimately connected to the Bielke family. When the Swedish National Heritage Board was created in 1630, its objective was to preserve ancient monuments and cultural heritage, including kronkåsor.

Usage
Kronkåsor were probably used during festive occasions and seem to have been only used by members of the nobility.

References

Drinking culture
Drinkware
Swedish culture
Renaissance art